The Asset Protection Agency (APA) was an executive agency of the Government of the United Kingdom, operating as part of HM Treasury. The APA was created in response to the late-2000s recession (caused by the financial crisis of 2007–2010) to implement the Asset Protection Scheme (APS), part of the 2009 United Kingdom bank rescue package. It closed on 31 October 2012 following the ending of the APS.

See also
National Asset Management Agency

References

External links
Official website of the Asset Protection Agency

Defunct executive agencies of the United Kingdom government
HM Treasury